Kazuko (written: , , , , ,  or  in hiragana) is primarily a feminine Japanese given name. Notable people with the name include:

, Japanese writer and translator
, Japanese manga artist
, Japanese opera composer
, Japanese astrologer and writer
, Japanese alpine skier
, Japanese table tennis player
, Japanese women's basketball player
, Japanese politician
, Japanese costume designer
, Japanese novelist
, Japanese tennis player
, Japanese video game artist
, Japanese poet and translator
, Japanese actress
, Japanese gymnast
, Japanese voice actress
, Japanese character designer and animation director
, Japanese princess
, Japanese Roman Catholic nun, educator and writer
, Japanese voice actress
, Japanese judge and diplomat
, Japanese actress

See also
6496 Kazuko, a main-belt asteroid

Japanese feminine given names